is a passenger railway station located in the city of Tatsuno, Hyōgo Prefecture, Japan, operated by West Japan Railway Company (JR West).

Lines

Station layout
The station consists of two opposed ground-level side platforms connected to the station building by a level crossing. The station is unattended.

Platforms

History
Higashi-Hashisaki Station opened on 23 December 1931. With the privatization of Japanese National Railways (JNR) on 1 April 1987, the station came under the control of JR West.

Passenger statistics
In fiscal 2019, the station was used by an average of 423 passengers daily.

Surrounding area
 Tenobe Somen Ibo-no-Ito Museum

See also
List of railway stations in Japan

References

External links

 Station Official Site

Railway stations in Hyōgo Prefecture
Kishin Line
Railway stations in Japan opened in 1931
Tatsuno, Hyōgo